Ahmad Rashad Treaudo (born April 15, 1982) is a former American football cornerback. He was signed by the New York Giants as an undrafted free agent in 2005. He spent his redshirt freshman season at Delta State University in 2002 and transferred to Southern University in Baton Rouge Louisiana where he completed his college football career before being picked up as an undrafted free agent.

Treaudo was also a member of the San Francisco 49ers, Atlanta Falcons, Minnesota Vikings, New Orleans VooDoo and Edmonton Eskimos.

Professional career

California Redwoods
Treaudo was signed by the California Redwoods of the United Football League on August 18, 2009.

External links
Just Sports Stats

1982 births
Living people
Players of American football from New Orleans
Players of Canadian football from New Orleans
American football cornerbacks
American players of Canadian football
Canadian football defensive backs
Delta State Statesmen football players
Southern Jaguars football players
New York Giants players
San Francisco 49ers players
Atlanta Falcons players
Minnesota Vikings players
New Orleans VooDoo players
Edmonton Elks players
Sacramento Mountain Lions players